Type 60 is a tracked tractor developed in the 1960s to tow missile launchers, mobile radar. Developed by Luyang Tractor Manufactory in 1975 and still un use by the People's Liberation Army of the People's Republic of China.

Variants

 Type 60-I - five seater

References
 Type 60

Tracked vehicles